Prosellodrilus is a genus of annelids belonging to the family Lumbricidae.

The species of this genus are found in Europe.

Species:

Prosellodrilus alatus 
Prosellodrilus albus 
Prosellodrilus amplisetosus 
Prosellodrilus arenicola

References

Lumbricidae
Annelid genera